Chet Raymo (born September 17, 1936 in Chattanooga, Tennessee) is a noted writer, educator and naturalist.  He is Professor Emeritus of Physics at Stonehill College, in Easton, Massachusetts. His weekly newspaper column "Science Musings" appeared in the Boston Globe for twenty years. This is now a daily blog by him. Raymo espouses his religious naturalism in When God is Gone Everything is Holy – The Making of a Religious Naturalist and frequently in his blog. As Raymo says – "I attend to this infinitely mysterious world with reverence, awe, thanksgiving, praise. All religious qualities."
Raymo has been a contributor to The Notre Dame Magazine and Scientific American.

His most famous book is the novel entitled The Dork of Cork, which was made into the feature-length film Frankie Starlight. Raymo is also the author of Walking Zero, a scientific and historical account of his wanderings along the Prime Meridian in Great Britain. Raymo was the recipient of the 1998 Lannan Literary Award for his non-fiction work.

Raymo espouses a scientific skepticism for his beliefs:

Major works
 1982 365 Starry Nights 
 1984 Biography of a Planet 
 1985 The Soul of the Night 
 1987 Honey from Stone 
 1990 In the Falcon's Claw 
 1991 The Virgin and the Mousetrap: Essays in Search of the Soul of Science, Viking Books 
 1993 The Dork of Cork 
 1998 Skeptics and True Believers 
 2000 Natural Prayers 
 2001 An Intimate Look at the Night Sky 
 2003 The Path 
 2004 Climbing Brandon 
 2005 Valentine 
 2006 Walking Zero 
 2008 When God is Gone, Everything is Holy

References

External links
Science Musings (official blog site)
Lannan Foundation Biography

1936 births
Living people
Religious naturalists
American male writers
University of Notre Dame alumni
Writers about religion and science